Sachi Amma (born September 23, 1989) is a Japanese professional rock climber and sport climber. He won the IFSC Climbing World Cup twice, in 2012 and 2013.

Biography 
In 2006 he started competing at the World Cup, in the Lead climbing discipline, and won the Cup twice, in 2012 and 2013. In 2009, 2010 and 2012 he also competed, occasionally, in the Bouldering discipline, with less encouraging results.

He mainly climbs indoor, but he also proved to be one of the strongest rock climbers in the world, by redpointing three routes graded : Papichulo (Oliana), Pachamama (Oliana), and La Rambla (Siurana).

He has since repointed one additional : Realization (Céüse) and two routes graded : Soul Mate (Gozen Rock) and Fight or Flight (Oliana), the former becoming Japan's hardest sport climb.

Rankings

Climbing World Cup

Climbing World Championships

Number of medals in the Climbing World Cup

Lead

Rock climbing

Redpointed routes 
:
 Soul Mate – Gozen Rock (JAP) – March 2018 – First ascent. Described as Japan's hardest route and first 9b.
 Fight or Flight – Oliana (ESP) – February 2015 – First ascent by Chris Sharma.

:
 Realization – Céüse (FRA) – August 6, 2014 – First ascent by Chris Sharma, 2001
 La Rambla – Siurana (ESP) – November 29, 2012 – First ascent by Ramón Julián Puigblanqué, 2003
 Pachamama – Oliana (ESP) – December 17, 2011 – First ascent by Chris Sharma, 2009
 Papichulo – Oliana (ESP) – December 24, 2010 – First ascent by Chris Sharma, 2008

:
 Era Vella – Margalef (ESP) – December 2, 2012
 Kinematix – Gorges du Loup (FRA) – August 2009 – First ascent by Andreas Bindhammer, 2001

See also
List of grade milestones in rock climbing
History of rock climbing
Rankings of most career IFSC gold medals

References

External links 

1989 births
Living people
Japanese rock climbers
Competitors at the 2009 World Games
World Games gold medalists
IFSC Climbing World Championships medalists
IFSC Climbing World Cup overall medalists